Bojna may refer to:

 Bojná, a village in Slovakia
 Bojna, Croatia, a village near Glina, Croatia